Fossarus lamellosus is a species of sea snail, a marine gastropod mollusk in the family Planaxidae.

Description

Distribution
This species occurs in the Red Sea and in the Indian Ocean off the Aldabra Atoll.

References

 Taylor, J.D. (1971). Intertidal Zonation at Aldabra Atoll. Phil. Trns. Roy. Soc. Lond. B. 260, 173–213

External links

Planaxidae